Andrea L. Doll (born August 14, 1940) is a Democratic politician in the U.S. state of Alaska.  She served a single term in the Alaska House of Representatives, representing the 4th District from 2007 to 2009.

External links
 Alaska State Legislature - Representative Andrea Doll official government website
 Project Vote Smart - Representative Andrea L. Doll (AK) profile
 Follow the Money - Andrea Doll
 2006 campaign contributions
 Alaska's Democratic Caucus - Andrea Doll profile
 Andrea Doll at 100 Years of Alaska's Legislature

Democratic Party members of the Alaska House of Representatives
1940 births
Living people
Politicians from Buffalo, New York
Politicians from Juneau, Alaska
Women state legislators in Alaska
21st-century American politicians
21st-century American women politicians